The Rat may refer to:

Arts and entertainment
 The Rat (play), a 1924 play written by Ivor Novello and Constance Collier
 The Rat (1925 film), a film by Ivor Novello based on his play of the same name
 The Rat (1937 film), another film adaptation of the play
 "The Rat" (Beavis and Butt-Head), an episode of the American television show Beavis and Butt-Head
 "The Rat" (Prison Break episode), an episode of the American television show Prison Break
 "The Rat" (song), a 2004 song by The Walkmen from their album Bows + Arrows
 "The Rat", a song by Dead Confederate from their album Wrecking Ball
 The Rat (novel), a book by Günter Grass published in German in 1986 as Die Rättin
 The Rat, a character from Haruki Murakami's 'Trilogy of the Rat' Hear the Wind Sing, Pinball, 1973 and A Wild Sheep Chase

Nickname
 Niki Lauda (born 1949), Austrian former Formula One race car driver
 Ken Linseman (born 1958), former National Hockey League player
 Jeff Ratcliffe (born 1976), former professional lacrosse player

Music
 The Rathskellar (The Rat), a now-defunct live music venue in Kenmore Square, Boston, Massachusetts
 Pro Co RAT, aka "The RAT", a distortion pedal

See also 
 Blek le Rat, an influential French graffiti artist
The Rats (disambiguation)
Rat (disambiguation)

Lists of people by nickname